Dominic Chianese (born February 24, 1931) is an American actor, singer, and musician. He is best known for his roles as Corrado "Junior" Soprano on the HBO series The Sopranos (1999–2007), Johnny Ola in The Godfather Part II (1974), and Leander in Boardwalk Empire (2011–2013).

Early life
Chianese was born in the Bronx, New York. His father was a bricklayer. His paternal grandfather immigrated to the United States from Afragola, in the metropolitan city of Naples in 1904 and settled in the Bronx. Chianese graduated from the Bronx High School of Science in 1948.

Career
After a decade of attending college and appearing in off-Broadway theatre, Chianese attended his first professional acting class at HB Studio in Manhattan, with renowned teacher Walt Witcover.  Drama and musical theater became Chianese's passion.  His first Broadway show was Oliver! in 1965. He has continued to perform in Broadway theatre, Off Broadway, and regional theatre. To supplement income in the dry periods, he played rhythm guitar and sang in taverns and restaurants, and also served as the master of ceremonies at the open microphone night at Gerdes Folk City in Greenwich Village. Chianese's first television credit occurred when George C. Scott recommended him for a role in  the acclaimed series East Side/West Side. In 1974, Francis Ford Coppola cast Chianese as Johnny Ola in The Godfather Part II, which sparked a film career, culminating in several films (and plays) with Al Pacino.

Before being cast in The Godfather Part II, Chianese worked for the Drug Commission of New York State as a recreational worker in a rehabilitation center. He taught guitar to women who were serving time for drug-related crimes.

In 2010, Chianese received the Ellis Island Medal of Honor in recognition of his humanitarian efforts.

Chianese has appeared in four movies with Al Pacino:
The Godfather Part II (1974) – as Johnny Ola
Dog Day Afternoon (1975) – as Sonny's Father
...And Justice For All (1979) – as Carl Travers
Looking for Richard (1996) – as Himself

Chianese is an accomplished tenor and musician. He released a CD titled Hits in 2000, on which he sings American and Italian songs, that he recorded in Nashville. He performed Salvatore Cardillo's sentimental classic "Core 'ngrato" ("Ungrateful Heart"), on the third-season finale of The Sopranos (episode 3.13, "Army of One"). In 2003, Chianese, along with AOL Music, released a second CD titled Ungrateful Heart, which features 16 classic Neapolitan songs. In the 2000s he played in a mandolin quartet weekly at the Hotel Edison, New York City.

Chianese appeared as a guest actor on the HBO series Boardwalk Empire for three seasons as Leander Whitlock, a retired lawyer and power broker.

In December 2018, Chianese and co-author Matthew Sargent published a biography of Chianese, titled Twelve Angels: The Women Who Taught Me How to Act, Live, and Love.

Filmography

Film
{| class = "wikitable sortable"
|-
! Year
! Title
! Role
! class = "unsortable" | Notes
|-
| 1972
| Fuzz
| Panhandler
| 
|-
| 1974
| The Godfather Part II
| Johnny Ola
| 
|-
| 1975
| Dog Day Afternoon
| Mr. Wortzik
| 
|-
| 1976
| All the President's Men
| Eugenio R. Martínez
| 
|-
| 1978
| Fingers| Arthur Fox
| 
|-
| 1978
| On the Yard| Mendoza
| Uncredited
|-
| 1979
| Firepower| Orlov
| 
|-
| 1979
| ...And Justice for All| Carl Travers
| 
|-
| 1981
| Fort Apache, the Bronx| Mr. Corelli
| 
|-
| 1989
| Second Sight| Father Dominic
| 
|-
| 1990
| Q&A| Larry Pesch / Vito / Lorenzo Franconi 
| 
|-
| 1991
| Out for Justice| Mr. Madano
| 
|-
| 1992
| The Public Eye| Spoleto
| 
|-
| 1993
| Rivalen des Glücks – The Contenders| Father of the bride
| 
|-
| 1993
| The Night We Never Met| Nosy Neighbor
| 
|-
| 1996
| If Lucy Fell| Al
| 
|-
| 1996
| Love Is All There Is| Italian Consul
| 
|-
| 1996
| The Mouse| Al the Trainer
| 
|-
| 1996
| Looking for Richard| Himself
| Documentary
|-
| 1997
| Night Falls on Manhattan| Judge Impelliteri
| 
|-
| 1998
| Went to Coney Island on a Mission from God... Be Back by Five| Mickey
| 
|-
| 1999
| Cradle Will Rock| Silvano
| 
|-
| 2002
| Unfaithful| Frank Wilson
| 
|-
| 2004
| When Will I Be Loved| Count Tommaso Lupo
| 
|-
| 2004
| King of the Corner| Stan Marshak
| 
|-
| 2007
| The Last New Yorker| Lenny Sugarman
|
|-
| 2007
| Adrift in Manhattan| Tommaso Pensara
| 
|-
| 2011
| Mr. Popper's Penguins| Reader
| 
|-
| 2013
| The Family| Vinnie Caprese 
| 
|-
| 2017
| Active Adults| Bart 
|
|-
|}

Television

References

External links
 
 
 A conversation with Dominic Chianese, The Sopranos' Uncle Junior in 
 Dominic Chianese - Downstage Center'' interview at American Theatre Wing.org

American male film actors
American male television actors
American male stage actors
Male actors from New York City
1931 births
Living people
American tenors
Singers from New York City
Brooklyn College alumni
Rhythm guitarists
American humanitarians
20th-century American male actors
21st-century American male actors
People from the Bronx
American people of Italian descent
Activists from New York (state)
Guitarists from New York City
American male guitarists
20th-century American guitarists
20th-century American male musicians
The Bronx High School of Science alumni
American mandolinists